Super 2 may refer to:

Super two, a two-lane road built to high but not expressway standards
Super two (baseball), Major League Baseball salary arbitration eligibility
Super2 Series, Australian motor racing series
Two-lane expressway
ARV Super2